Diane Dezura (born July 1, 1958 in Burnaby, British Columbia as Diane Nelson) is a Canadian retired curler and Olympic medalist. As Diane Nelson, she played lead on for the Kelley Law rink in the early 2000s, one of the best teams in the world at the time. While she was with the team, the Law rink won a world championship in 2000 and a bronze medal at the 2002 Winter Olympics in Salt Lake City.

In her career, Dezura played in five Scott Tournament of Hearts, in 1988, 1989, 2000, 2001 and in 2004, winning the event in 2000.

Personal life
Dezura retired from curling in 2004. She is married to fellow curler Grant Dezura and they live in Maple Ridge, British Columbia with their two children, Ashley Ann and Wally.

References

External links
 

1958 births
Canadian women curlers
Curlers at the 2002 Winter Olympics
Curlers from British Columbia
Living people
Olympic bronze medalists for Canada
Olympic curlers of Canada
Sportspeople from Burnaby
World curling champions
Canadian women's curling champions
Olympic medalists in curling
Medalists at the 2002 Winter Olympics
People from Maple Ridge, British Columbia
Continental Cup of Curling participants
Canada Cup (curling) participants